A rapid transit is a public transport system in an urban area with high capacity, high frequency not needing timetables, is fast and is segregated from other traffic.

Rapid transit may also refer to:
Bus rapid transit, a term applied to a variety of public transportation systems using buses
Bombardier Advanced Rapid Transit, a rapid transit system manufactured by Bombardier Transportation
 Rapid Transit (play), a 1927 play by Lajos Egri

See also
 Subway (disambiguation)
 Mass Rapid Transit (disambiguation)
 List of rapid transit systems